Shul-e Bozi (also Romanized as Shūl-e Bozī; also known as Bozī and Shūn Bozī) is a village in Khorram Makan Rural District, Kamfiruz District, Marvdasht County, Fars Province, Iran. At the 2006 census, its population was 850, in 147 families.

References 

Populated places in Marvdasht County